Jocelyn Lee is an American contemporary artist and photographer currently based in Portland, Maine and Brooklyn, New York.

Jocelyn Lee has been making psychological portraits for over 35 years; she also works in a variety of genres including still life and landscape.  Her work has been exhibited internationally and is included in many public and private collections. She works exclusively in film with a medium format camera. Lee has published three monographs: "The Youngest Parents" with Dr. Robert Coles (DoubleTake Books 1996); "Nowhere but Here" with a foreword by Sharon Olds (Steidl, 2010); and "Sovereign" which includes an essay by curator Dr. April Watson (Minor Matters Books, 2020).

Lee is also the founder of SPEEDWELL projects in Portland, Maine, a nonprofit gallery dedicated to promoting the work of mid to late career women, BIPOC and LGBTQ+ artists who deserve greater critical attention.

Early life 
Lee was born in Naples, Italy. She received a B.A. from Yale University in Studio Art and Photography and an M.F.A. in Photography from the City University of New York at Hunter College.

Career 
Jocelyn Lee was born in Naples Italy and received her B.A. in philosophy and visual arts from Yale University, and her M.F.A in photography from Hunter College. In 2013 she received a NYFA Fellowship, and in 2001 she received a Guggenheim Fellowship.

She is represented by Huxley Parlour Gallery in London, and Flatland Gallery in Amsterdam, The Netherlands.

Her third monograph "Sovereign" was published by Minor Matters Books in November 2020 with an essay by curator Dr. April Watson; her first monograph "Nowhere but here" was published by Steidl Publishers in December 2010 with a foreword by Sharon Olds; and in 1996 her work The Youngest Parents was published by DoubleTake Books and The Center for Documentary Studies at Duke University in collaboration with Robert Coles and John Moses.

Lee has exhibited nationally and internationally, most recently in solo shows at the Huxley-Parlour Gallery, London (2018) and The Center for Maine Contemporary Art in Rockland, Maine (2018). She has also been included in significant group shows at the DeCordova Museum in Lincoln, Massachusetts (2018); the Portland Museum of Art, Portland, Maine (2017) and (2013) for which she won a purchase prize; Wesleyan University (2017); Rose Gallery in L.A. (2017); Pace MacGill Gallery (2017); The Print Space in London, UK (2014); The Nelson Atkins Museum in Kansas City, MO (2014); and the John Michael Kohler Arts Center in Sheboygan, WI (2014)

Other significant solo and large exhibitions of her work include a solo show at Flatland Gallery in Amsterdam, The Netherlands (2012); Rose Gallery in L.A. (2011) and Pace MacGill Gallery in NY (2010) to accompany her the publication of her monograph Nowhere but here; “Feature Photography” at The National Portrait Gallery, Smithsonian Institution in Washington, DC, (2008); "Last Light" at The University of Southern Maine, Solo (2008); Pace MacGill Gallery in NY, Solo (2007) and Group (2005); The De Cordova Museum in Waltham, MA (2007); The Center for Maine Contemporary Art, Rockland, ME, Solo (2007), The University of Maine Museum of Art, Solo (2006); Stone Hill College, Easton, MA, Solo (2005);The Bernard Toale Gallery, Boston, MA, Solo (2004/2003); The Bates College Museum of Art in Augusta, ME, (2004); The Smith College Museum of Art in Northampton, MA (2004); The Colby College Museum of Art, Waterville, ME, (2004); Jackson Fine Art in Atlanta, GA, (2003); The LFL Gallery in NYC, Solo (2001); The Portland Museum of Art in Portland, ME, (2001); and The Rose Art Museum, Brandeis University, Waltham, MA(2000).

Her works are in the collections of Maison Europeen de la Photographie, Paris, France; The Museum Folkwang, Essen, Germany; The Yale Museum of Art, New Haven, CT; The List Center at MIT, Cambridge, MA; The Portland Museum of Art; Portland, ME; The Nelson Atkins Museum, Kansas City, MO.; The Colby College Museum of Art, Waterville, ME; The Haggerty Museum of Art, Milwaukee, Wisconsin; The Bowdoin College Museum of Art, Brunswick, ME; The Center for Documentary Studies at Duke University, N.C.; The Museum of Fine Arts, Houston, TX; The Bates College Museum of Art. Lewiston, ME; The Farnsworth Art Museum, Rockport, ME; The Margulies Collection; as well as numerous other private collections.

Her work has appeared in many national and international publications including The New York Times Magazine, The New Yorker, New York Magazine, Photo Raw (Helsinki, Finland), Snoeks (Germany), Real Simple, MORE magazine, PDN, Allegra (The Netherlands), DoubleTake, the Hayden Review, Marie Claire (Taiwan) and Harper’s and others.

Jocelyn Lee’s melancholy photographs of women through every stage of life in Creative Boom by Tora Baker – March 4, 2018

10 Must-See Artists at AIPAD’s Photography Show in Artsy by Alina Cohen – April 9, 2018

Transient Moments in Aesthetica Magazine – April 11, 2018

Jocelyn Lee’s first UK solo exhibition surveys The Appearance of Things (NSFW) in It’s Nice That by Lucy Bourton – April 19, 2018

“The Unclothed Body is Our Primary Vessel”: Photographing Vulnerability in AnOther by Miss Rosen – April 20, 2018

Jocelyn Lee: The Appearance of Things at the Center for Maine Contemporary Art in Lens/cratch by Aline Smithson – June 5, 2018

The Ticket: What’s happening in the local arts world in The Boston Globe by Cate McQuaid – June 15, 2018

Jocelyn Lee’s painterly portraits of nudes immersed in nature in The New Yorker by Rebecca Bengal – June 15, 2018

Jocelyn Lee explores the cycle of life in photography exhibition in Rockland in MaineToday by Bob Keyes – June 18, 2018

Jocelyn Lee: The Appearance of Things in Photograph Magazine – June 25, 2018

Best Photo Picks for Summer 2018! in What Will You Remember? by Elin Spring – June 28, 2018

Jocelyn Lee : < The Appearance of Things > in Fisheye Magazine by Lou Tsatsas – June 29, 2018

Jocelyn Lee – The Appearance of Things in The Eye of Photography by L’ŒIL DE LA PHOTOGRAPHIE – July 4, 2018

Maine’s Mini-Mecca: Contemporary on the Coast in Artscope Magazine by Greg Morell – July 5, 2018

Bathing in Images: The Maine art season celebrates the cultural dominance of photography in Portland Phoenix – July 5, 2018

Art review: Rockland exhibits are upside down, in the water and all over the place in Portland Press Herald by Daniel Kany – July 15, 2018

Tuesday Night Talk Radio Club on WMPG with Chris White – July 17, 2018

Jocelyn Lee in Carnet d’Art by Jean Paul Gavard Perret – July 17, 2018

Jocelyn Lee Captures The Appearance Of Things in Ignant by Rosie Flanagan – July 23, 2018

Appearance of Things: life and death in Jocelyn Lee’s photography in Collateral by Claudia Fuggetti – July 25, 2018

Photographic style 
Lee creates color photographic portraits, oftentimes of people who she knows such as family members, as well as of people whom she's never before met. She finds models for some of her photographs by placing ads in local newspapers. Many of her subjects are depicted nude or are minimally dressed. Some of her photographs depict landscapes and many of her portraits were taken outdoors. The American poet Sharon Olds wrote the foreword to Lee's book "Jocelyn Lee: Nowhere But Here" (2010).

References

External links
 Jocelyn Lee official website
www.jocelynleestudio.com

“The Fact of Us” - Photographer Jocelyn Lee
https://m.youtube.com/watch?v=H74pTVk-_F4

American women photographers
1962 births
Living people
Yale School of Art alumni
Hunter College alumni
21st-century American women